Heterocampa benitensis, the spring snowflake, is a species of moth in the family Notodontidae (the prominents). It was first described by André Blanchard in 1971 and it is found in North America.

The MONA or Hodges number for Heterocampa benitensis is 7987.

References

Further reading

 
 
 

Notodontidae
Articles created by Qbugbot
Moths described in 1971